is a  mountain of Daiko Mountains, which is located on the border of Higashiyoshino, Nara, and Matsusaka, Mie, Japan

Outline 
This mountain is located on the north end of Daiko Mountains. This mountain is considered one of the 300 Famous Japanese Mountains. This mountain is an important part of Muro-Akame-Aoyama Quasi National Park.

Routes
This mountain is very famous for the beautiful frost patterns that form on trees in winter and so attract many climbers. There are several routes to reach the top; one is from Takami-Otoge Pass and it takes about one hour; another route is from Takami-tozanguchi Bus Stop on the Nara Kotsu bus route, and it takes two and a half hours. The third route is from Shimo-Hirano Bus stop, also on the Nara Kotsu bus route, and it also takes two and a half hours.

Gallery

References 

 Official Home Page of the Geographical Survey Institute in Japan
 Omine, Daitaka, Odaigahara

Takami
Takami